Caton is the surname of the following people:

Academics
Gertrude Caton-Thompson (1888–1985), English archaeologist
Hiram Caton (1936–2010), Australian academic
Richard Caton (1842–1926), English scientist

Performers
Lauderic Caton (1910–1999), Trinidadian guitarist
Michael Caton (born 1943), Australian television, film and stage actor
Nathan Caton (born 1984), English comedian
Roy Caton, trumpet player
Steve Caton, American musician

Politics and law
Homer Caton (1887-1958), Illinois politician and farmer
John D. Caton (1812–1895), chief justice of the Illinois Supreme Court
Martin Caton (born 1951), Welsh politician

Sportspeople

Andrew Caton (born 1987), English footballer
Bill Caton (1924–2011), English footballer
Dylan Caton (born 1995), Australian footballer
Eugene Caton, football player and coach
Howdy Caton (1894–1948), American professional baseball player
James Caton (born 1994), English footballer
Kevin Caton (born 1965), retired Australian rules footballer
Larry Caton (born 1948), American handball player
Noah Caton (1897–1922), American football player 
Tommy Caton (1962–1993), English footballer

Others
David Caton (born 1956), American political activist and writer
Greg Caton (born 1956), American businessman, inventor, manufacturer and promoter of herbal products
Michael Caton-Jones (born 1957), Scottish film director
Reginald Caton (1897–1971), British publisher
Shaun Caton, British performance artist
William Caton (1636–1665), English Quaker itinerant preacher and writer

English-language surnames